Florence Onyebuchi "Buchi" Emecheta  (21 July 1944 – 25 January 2017) was a Nigerian-born novelist, based in the UK from 1962, who also wrote plays and an autobiography, as well as works for children. She was the author of more than 20 books, including Second Class Citizen (1974), The Bride Price (1976), The Slave Girl (1977) and The Joys of Motherhood (1979). Most of her early novels were published by Allison and Busby, where her editor was Margaret Busby.

Emecheta's themes of child slavery, motherhood, female independence and freedom through education gained recognition from critics and honours. She once described her stories as "stories of the world, where women face the universal problems of poverty and oppression, and the longer they stay, no matter where they have come from originally, the more the problems become identical."  Her works explore the tension between tradition and modernity. She has been characterized as "the first successful black woman novelist living in Britain after 1948".

Early life and education
Buchi Emecheta was born on 21 July 1944, in Lagos, Nigeria, to Igbo parents, Alice (Okwuekwuhe) Emecheta and Jeremy Nwabudinke. Her parents were from Umuezeokolo Odeanta village in Ibusa, Delta State. Her father was a railway worker and moulder. Her novel, The Slave Girl (1977) is inspired by her mother, Alice Ogbanje Ojebeta Emecheta  a former slave girl, was sold into slavery by her brother to a relative to buy  silk head ties for his coming-of age dance. When her mistress died, Ogbanje Emecheta returned  home to freedom.  Due to the gender bias of the time, the young Emecheta was initially kept at home while her younger brother was sent to school; but after persuading her parents to consider the benefits of her education, she spent her early childhood at an all-girls' missionary school. When she was nine years old, her father died "of complications brought on by a wound contracted in the swamps of Burma, where he had been conscripted to fight for Lord Louis Mountbatten and the remnants of the British Empire". A year later, Emecheta received a full scholarship to Methodist Girls' School in Yaba, Lagos, where she remained until the age of 16. During this time, her mother died, leaving Emecheta an orphan. In 1960, she married Sylvester Onwordi, a schoolboy to whom she had been engaged since she was 11 years old. Later that year, she gave birth to a daughter, and in 1961 their younger son was born.

Onwordi immediately moved to London to attend a university, and Emecheta joined him there with their first two children in 1962. She gave birth to five children in six years, three daughters and two sons Her marriage was unhappy and sometimes violent, as chronicled in her autobiographical writings such as 1974's Second-Class Citizen. To keep her sanity, Emecheta wrote in her spare time. However, her husband was deeply suspicious of her writing, and he ultimately burned her first manuscript, as revealed in The Bride Price, eventually published in 1976. That was her first book, but she had to rewrite it after the first version had been destroyed. She later said: "There were five years between the two versions." At the age of 22, pregnant with her fifth child, Emecheta left her husband. While working to support her children alone, she earned a B.Sc. (Hons) degree in Sociology in 1972 from the University of London. In her 1984 autobiography, Head above Water, she wrote: "As for my survival for the past twenty years in England, from when I was a little over twenty, dragging four cold and dripping babies with me and pregnant with a fifth one—that is a miracle." She went on to gain her PhD from the university in 1991.

Career
Emecheta began writing about her experiences of Black British life in a regular column in the New Statesman, and a collection of these pieces became her first published book in 1972, In the Ditch. The semi-autobiographical novel chronicled the struggles of a main character named Adah, who is forced to live in a housing estate while working as a librarian to support her five children. Her second novel published two years later, Second-Class Citizen (Allison and Busby, 1974), also drew on Emecheta's own experiences, and both books were eventually published in one volume by Allison and Busby under the title Adah's Story (1983). These three stories introduced Emecheta's three major themes which were the quest for equal treatment, self confidence and dignity as a woman. Her works Gwendolen (1989) also published as family, Kehinde (1994) and The New Tribe (2000) differ in some way as they address the issues of immigrants life in Great Britain.

From 1965 to 1969, Emecheta worked as a library officer for the British Museum in London. From 1969 to 1976, she was a youth worker and sociologist for the Inner London Education Authority, and from 1976 to 1978 she worked as a community worker in Camden, North London, meanwhile continuing to produce further novels with Allison and Busby – The Bride Price (1976), The Slave Girl (1977), The Joys of Motherhood (1979) and Destination Biafra (1982) – as well as the children's books Titch the Cat (1979) and Nowhere To Play (1980).

Following her success as an author, Emecheta travelled widely as a visiting professor and lecturer. She visited several American universities, including Pennsylvania State University, Rutgers University, the University of California, Los Angeles, and the University of Illinois at Urbana-Champaign. From 1980 to 1981, she was senior resident fellow and visiting professor of English at the University of Calabar, Nigeria. From 1982 to 1983, Emecheta, together with her son Sylvester, ran the Ogwugwu Afor Publishing Company, publishing her own work under the imprint, beginning with Double Yoke (1982). She received an Arts Council of Great Britain bursary, 1982–83, and was one of Granta'''s "Best of the Young British Novelists" in 1983. In 1982, she lectured at Yale University, and the University of London. She became a Fellow at the University of London in 1986.

Over the years, Emecheta worked with many cultural and literary organizations, including the Africa Centre, London, and with the Caine Prize for African Writing as a member of the Advisory Council.

Buchi Emecheta suffered a stroke in 2010, and she died in London on 25 January 2017, aged 72.

Most of her fictional works are focused on sexual discrimination and racial prejudice informed by her own experiences as both a single parent and a black woman living in the United Kingdom.

Awards and recognition
Among honours received during her literary career, Emecheta won the 1978 Jock Campbell Prize from the New Statesman (first won by Chinua Achebe's Arrow of God) for her novel The Slave Girl, and she was on Granta magazine's 1983 list of 20 "Best of Young British Novelists"."Buchi Emecheta 1944–", Concise Major 21st Century Writers , encyclopedia.com. She was a member of the British Home Secretary's Advisory Council on Race in 1979.

In September 2004, she appeared in the "A Great Day in London" photograph taken at the British Library, featuring 50 Black and Asian writers who have made major contributions to contemporary British literature.Le Gendre, Kevin, "Books: A great day for a family get together Who are the movers and shakers in black British writing? And can they all fit on one staircase?", The Independent on Sunday, 17 October 2004. In 2005, she was made an OBE for services to literature.

She received an Honorary doctorate of literature from Farleigh Dickinson University in 1992.

Legacy
In 2017, Emecheta's son Sylvester Onwordi announced the formation of the Buchi Emecheta Foundation – a charitable organisation promoting literary and educational projects in the UK and in Africa – which was launched in London on 3 February 2018 at the Brunei Gallery, SOAS, together with new editions of several of her books published by Onwordi through his Omenala Press."Celebrating Buchi Emecheta" , Royal African Society Among participants in the "Celebrating Buchi Emecheta" day-long event – "a gathering of writers, critics, artists, publishers, literature enthusiasts and cultural activists from all over the world, including London and other parts of the U.K., France, Germany, U.S., Canada, Nigeria, Ghana, Kenya, South Africa, and the Caribbean" – were Diane Abbott, Leila Aboulela, Carole Boyce Davies, Margaret Busby, James Currey, Louisa Uchum Egbunike, Ernest Emenyonu, Akachi Ezeigbo, Kadija George, Mpalive Msiska, Grace Nichols, Alastair Niven, Irenosen Okojie, Veronique Tadjo, Marie Linton Umeh, Wangui wa Goro, and Bibi Bakare-Yusuf.Cobbinah, Angela, "How African writer gave women and girls a voice", Camden New Journal, 16 February 2018.

Buchi Emecheta features at number 98 on a list of 100 women recognised in August 2018 by BBC History Magazine as having changed the world."100 Women Who Changed the World: the results", History Extra, 9 August 2018.

In March 2019, Camden Town Brewery launched a football kit using artwork featuring "some of the most inspiring female icons to have influenced the brewery's home borough of Camden".

On 21 July 2019, which would have been Emecheta's 75th birthday, Google commemorated her life with a Doodle.Perrone, Alessio, "Buchi Emecheta: Google Doodle celebrates prolific British-Nigerian author", The Independent, 21 July 2019."Google Doodle celebrates Buchi Emecheta on 75th posthumous birthday", The Punch (Nigeria), 21 July 2019.

In October 2019 a new exhibition space in the library for students at Goldsmiths, University of London, was dedicated to Buchi Emecheta.Gabi-Williams, Olatoun, "When Goldsmiths College honoured Buchi Emecheta", The Guardian (Nigeria), 24 November 2019.

In October 2021, Emecheta's second novel, Second Class Citizen, was reissued as a Penguin Modern Classic.

Works
NovelsIn the Ditch (1972)Second Class Citizen (1974)The Bride Price (1976)The Slave Girl (1977); winner of the New Statesmans 1978 Jock Campbell AwardThe Joys of Motherhood (1979)The Moonlight Bride (1981)Destination Biafra (1982)Naira Power (1982)Adah's Story [In the Ditch/Second-Class Citizen] (London: Allison & Busby, 1983).The Rape of Shavi (1983)Double Yoke (1982)A Kind of Marriage (London: Macmillan, 1986); Pacesetter Novels series.Gwendolen (1989). Published in the US as The FamilyKehinde (1994)The New Tribe (2000)

AutobiographyHead above Water (1984; 1986)

Children's/Young adults' booksTitch the Cat (illustrated by Thomas Joseph; 1979)Nowhere to Play (illustrated by Peter Archer; 1980)The Wrestling Match (1981)

PlaysJuju Landlord (episode of Crown Court), Granada Television, 1975.A Kind of Marriage, BBC television, 1976.Malik, Sarita, "Black TV Writers", BFI ScreenOnline.Family Bargain, BBC Television, 1987.

Articles and shorter writings
Introduction and comments to Our Own Freedom, photographs by Maggie Murray; 1981The Black Scholar, November–December 1985, p. 51.
"Feminism with a Small 'f'!" in Kirsten H. Petersen (ed.), Criticism and Ideology: Second African Writer's Conference, Stockholm 1988, Uppsala: Scandinanvian Institute of African Studies, 1988, pp. 173–181. Essence magazine, August 1990, p. 50.The New York Times Book Review, 29 April 1990.Publishers Weekly, 16 February 1990, p. 73; reprinted 7 February 1994, p. 84.World Literature Today, Autumn 1994, p. 867.

References

Further reading
 Curry, Ginette. Awakening African Women: The Dynamics of Change. Cambridge Scholars Press, 2004.
 Umeh, Marie (ed.), Emerging Perspectives on Buchi Emecheta (Foreword by Margaret Busby), Africa World Press, 1996. .

Selected tributes and obituaries
 Dennis Abrams, "Comments On the Work of the Late Nigerian Novelist Buchi Emecheta", Publishing Perspectives, 30 January 2017.
 Adekeye Adebajo, "Tribute to an African woman of courage", The Guardian (Nigeria), 31 January 2017.
 Adekunle, "Tribute to a literary lioness", Vanguard (Nigeria), 17 February 2017.
 Jane Bryce, "A Sort-of Career: Remembering Buchi Emecheta", Wasafiri, 10 February 2017.
 Margaret Busby, "Buchi Emecheta obituary", The Guardian, 3 February 2017.
 Eashani Chavda, "Black British Writing: A Tribute To Buchi Emecheta", gal-dem, 18 May 2017.
 Vimbai Chinembiri, "Buchi Emecheta: How she made her writing a voice for women" , Her (Zimbabwe), 28 January 2017.
 The Council of the Caine Prize for African Writing, "Tribute to Buchi Emecheta (1944–2017)", Caine Prize blog, 1 February 2017.
 William Grimes, "Buchi Emecheta, Nigerian Novelist, Dies at 72", The New York Times, 10 February 2017.
 Fred Obera, "Nigeria: Remembering Nigerian Literary Icon Buchi Emecheta", AllAfrica, 26 January 2017.
 Margaret Olele, "Of Buchi Emecheta and womankind", The Guardian (Nigeria), 14 March 2017.
 Sylvester Onwordi, "Remembering my mother Buchi Emecheta, 1944–2017", New Statesman, 31 January 2017. Also as "Remembering Buchi Emecheta, Nigerian novelist, feminist, my mother", African Arguments (Royal African Society), 1 February 2017.
 Niyi Osundare, "The Unintended Feminist: For Buchi Emecheta, 1944–2017", Sahara Reporters, 29 January 2017.

External links

 Buchi Emecheta Foundation website
 "Buchi Emecheta - Five books in tribute", Sunday Trust, 5 February 2017.
 
 Buchi Emecheta bio at the BBC Worldwide.
 Buchi Emecheta page at Emory University.
 The Roland Collection of Films & Videos on Art. Writers Talk: Ideas of our Time – Buchi Emecheta speaks with Susheila Nasta.
 Buchi Emecheta page at Sable''.

1944 births
2017 deaths
Officers of the Order of the British Empire
Gender studies academics
Igbo women writers
Igbo novelists
Nigerian women novelists
Nigerian sociologists
Alumni of University of London Worldwide
Alumni of the University of London
Academics of the University of London
Writers from Lagos
Women sociologists
20th-century Nigerian novelists
English-language writers from Nigeria
20th-century Nigerian women writers
Yale University faculty
Academic staff of the University of Calabar
Nigerian expatriate academics in the United States
Nigerian women academics
Igbo academics
Methodist Girls' High School alumni
Nigerian children's writers
Nigerian women children's writers
Nigerian emigrants to the United Kingdom
Nigerian publishers (people)
Nigerian dramatists and playwrights
British women dramatists and playwrights
Women autobiographers
Nigerian autobiographers
Black British women writers
Employees of the British Library
Employees of the British Museum